Kim Ga-eun (born 7 February 1998) is a South Korean badminton player. She competed and at the Summer Youth Olympics in 2014,  in Nanjing, China, and in 2016, Kim was selected to join the Korean national team. She also competed at the 2020 Tokyo Olympics.

Achievements

BWF World Junior Championships 
Girls' singles

Girls' doubles

Asian Junior Championships 
Girls' singles

BWF World Tour (2 titles, 2 runners-up) 
The BWF World Tour, which was announced on 19 March 2017 and implemented in 2018, is a series of elite badminton tournaments sanctioned by the Badminton World Federation (BWF). The BWF World Tour is divided into levels of World Tour Finals, Super 1000, Super 750, Super 500, Super 300 (part of the HSBC World Tour), and the BWF Tour Super 100.

Women's singles

BWF International Challenge/Series (2 runners-up) 
Women's singles

  BWF International Challenge tournament
  BWF International Series tournament
  BWF Future Series tournament

References

External links 
 

1998 births
Living people
Sportspeople from Ulsan
South Korean female badminton players
Badminton players at the 2014 Summer Youth Olympics
Badminton players at the 2020 Summer Olympics
Olympic badminton players of South Korea
21st-century South Korean women